LBG can refer to:

 Lake Burley Griffin, an artificial lake in the centre of Canberra
 Landenberg, Pennsylvania
 Laurinburg, North Carolina
 Paris - Le Bourget Airport
 Limbe Botanic Garden
 Lloyds Banking Group
 Location based game
 Locust bean gum, a galactomannan vegetable gum 
 London Bridge station (from the National Rail code)
 Long Beach Airport
 Louis Béland-Goyette, a Canadian soccer player
 The Linde–Buzo–Gray algorithm, a vector quantization algorithm to derive a good codebook.
 Lindesberg (Swedish town)
 Liquid Biogas
 Lyman-break galaxy 
 The LBG, a rock band from Chennai, India